The Indianapolis Colts are a professional American football team based in Indianapolis. The Colts compete in the National Football League (NFL) as a member club of the league's American Football Conference (AFC) South division. Since the 2008 season, the Colts have played their games in Lucas Oil Stadium. Previously, the team had played for over two decades (1984–2007) at the RCA Dome. Since 1987, the Colts have served as the host team for the NFL Scouting Combine.

The Colts have competed as a member club of the NFL since their founding in Baltimore, Maryland, in 1953, after then-owner Carroll Rosenbloom purchased the assets of the NFL's last founding Ohio League member Dayton Triangles-Dallas Texans franchise. They were one of three NFL teams to join those of the American Football League (AFL) to form the AFC, following the 1970 merger. While in Baltimore, the team advanced to the playoffs ten times and won three NFL Championship games in 1958, 1959, and 1968.  The Baltimore Colts played in two Super Bowl games, losing to the New York Jets in Super Bowl III and defeating the Dallas Cowboys in Super Bowl V. The Colts relocated to Indianapolis in 1984 and have since appeared in the playoffs sixteen times, won two conference championships, and played in two Super Bowl games; they defeated the Chicago Bears in Super Bowl XLI, and lost to the New Orleans Saints in Super Bowl XLIV (all four Super Bowls that the Colts have played in took place at the home stadium for the Miami Dolphins; while based in Baltimore, they played in Super Bowl III and Super Bowl V at the Orange Bowl in Miami, and while based in Indianapolis, they played in Super Bowl XLI and Super Bowl XLIV at what is now Hard Rock Stadium in Miami Gardens).

Franchise history

Baltimore Colts 
Following World War II, a competing professional football league was organized known as the All America Football Conference which began to play in the 1946 season. In its second year, the franchise assigned to the Miami Seahawks was relocated to Maryland's major commercial and manufacturing city of Baltimore. After a fan contest, the team was renamed the Baltimore Colts and used the team colors of silver and green. The Colts played for the next three seasons in the old AAFC. until they agreed to merge with the old National Football League (of 1920–1922 to 1950) when the NFL was reorganized. The Baltimore Colts were one of the three former AAFC powerhouse teams to merge with the NFL at that time, the others being the San Francisco 49ers and the Cleveland Browns. This Colts team, now in the "big league" of professional American football for the first time, although with shaky financing and ownership,  played only in the 1950 season of the NFL, and was later disbanded.

Carroll Rosenbloom era (1953-1971) 

In 1953, a new Baltimore-based group, heavily supported by the city's municipal government and with a large subscription-base of fan-purchased season tickets, led by local owner Carroll Rosenbloom won the rights to a new Baltimore NFL franchise. Rosenbloom was awarded the remains of the former Dallas Texans team, who themselves had a long and winding history, with a small part of the franchise starting as the Boston Yanks in 1944, merging later with the Brooklyn Tigers, a franchise that had a far more deep and rich history, being previously known as the Dayton Triangles, one of the original old NFL teams established even before the League itself, in 1913.  That team later became the New York Yanks in 1950, and many of the players from the New York Yankees of the former competing All-America Football Conference (1946–49) were added to the team to begin playing in the newly merged League for the 1950 season. The Yanks then moved to Dallas in Texas after the 1951 season having competed for two seasons, but played their final two "home" games of the 1952 season as a so-called "road team" at the Rubber Bowl football stadium in Akron, Ohio. The NFL considers the Texans and Colts to be separate teams, although many of the earlier teams shared the same colors of blue and white. Thus, the Indianapolis Colts are legally considered to be a 1953 expansion team.

Weeb Ewbank years (1954-1962) 
The current version of the Colts football team played their first season in Baltimore in 1953, where the team compiled a 3–9 record under first-year head coach Keith Molesworth. The franchise struggled during the first few years in Baltimore, with the team not achieving their first winning record until the 1957 season.

NFL champions (1958,1959) 
However, under head coach Weeb Ewbank and the leadership of quarterback Johnny Unitas, the Colts went on to a 9–3 record during the 1958 season and reached the NFL Championship Game for the first time in their history by winning the NFL Western Conference. The Colts faced the New York Giants in the 1958 NFL Championship Game, which is considered to be among the greatest contests in professional football history. The Colts defeated the Giants 23–17 in the first game ever to utilize the overtime rule, a game seen by 45 million people.

Following the Colts first NFL championship, the team posted a 9–3 record during the 1959 season and once again defeated the Giants in the NFL Championship Game to claim their second title in back to back fashion.

Don Shula years (1963-1969) 
Following the two championships in 1958 and 1959, the Colts did not return to the NFL Championship for four seasons and replaced the head coach Ewbank with the young Don Shula in 1963. In Shula's second season the Colts compiled a 12–2 record, but lost to the Cleveland Browns in the NFL Championship.

NFL champions (1968) 
In 1968 the Colts returned with the continued leadership of Unitas and Shula and went on to win the Colts' third NFL Championship and made an appearance in Super Bowl III.

Leading up to the Super Bowl and following the 34–0 trouncing of the Cleveland Browns in the NFL Championship, many were calling the 1968 Colts team one of the "greatest pro football teams of all time" and were favored by 18 points against their counterparts from the American Football League, the New York Jets. The Colts, however, were stunned by the Jets, who won the game 16–7 in the first Super Bowl victory for the young AFL. The result of the game surprised many in the sports media as Joe Namath and Matt Snell led the Jets to the Super Bowl victory under head coach Weeb Ewbank, who had previously won two NFL Championships with the Colts.

Don McCafferty years (1970-1972) 
Rosenbloom of the Colts, Art Modell of the Browns, and Art Rooney of the Pittsburgh Steelers agreed to have their teams join the ten AFL teams in the American Football Conference as part of the AFL–NFL merger in 1970.

Super Bowl V champions (1970) 
The Colts immediately went on a rampage in the new league, as new head coach Don McCafferty led the 1970 team to an 11–2–1 regular-season record, winning the AFC East title. In the first round of the NFL Playoffs, the Colts beat the Cincinnati Bengals 17–0; one week later in the first-ever AFC Championship Game, they beat the Oakland Raiders 27–17. Baltimore went on to win the first post-merger Super Bowl (Super Bowl V), defeating the National Football Conference's Dallas Cowboys 16–13 on a Jim O'Brien field goal with five seconds left to play. The victory gave the Colts their fourth NFL championship and first Super Bowl victory. Following the championship, the Colts returned to the playoffs in 1971 and defeated the Cleveland Browns in the first round, but lost to the Miami Dolphins in the AFC Championship.

Robert Irsay era (1971-1996) 
Citing friction with the City of Baltimore and the local press, Rosenbloom traded the Colts franchise to Robert Irsay on July 13, 1972 and received the Los Angeles Rams in return. Under the new ownership, the Colts did not reach the postseason for three consecutive seasons after 1971, and after the 1972 season, starting quarterback and legend Johnny Unitas was traded to the San Diego Chargers. Following Unitas' departure, the Colts made the playoffs three consecutive seasons from 1975 to 1977, losing in the divisional round each time. The Colts' 1977 playoff loss in double overtime against the Oakland Raiders was famous for the fact that it was the last playoff game for the Colts in Baltimore and is also known for the Ghost to the Post play. These consecutive championship teams featured 1976 NFL Most Valuable Player Bert Jones at quarterback and an outstanding defensive line, nicknamed the "Sack Pack."

Following the 1970s success, the team endured nine consecutive losing seasons beginning in 1978. In 1981, the Colts defense allowed an NFL-record 533 points, set an all-time record for fewest sacks (13), and also set a modern record for fewest punt returns (12). The following year, the offense collapsed, including a game against the Buffalo Bills where the Colts' offense did not cross mid-field the entire game. The Colts finished 0–8–1 in the strike-shortened 1982 season, thereby earning the right to select Stanford quarterback John Elway with the first overall pick. Elway, however, refused to play for Baltimore, and using leverage as a draftee of the New York Yankees baseball club, forced a trade to Denver. Behind an improved defense the team finished 7–9 in 1983, but that would be their last season in Baltimore.

Relocation to Indianapolis 

The Baltimore Colts played their final home game in Baltimore on December 18, 1983, against the then Houston Oilers. Irsay continued to request upgrades to Memorial Stadium or construction of a new stadium. As a result of the poor performance on the field and the stadium issues, fan attendance and team revenue continued to dwindle. City officials were precluded from using tax-payer funds for the building of a new stadium, and the modest proposals that were offered by the city were not acceptable to either the Colts or the city's MLB franchise the Orioles. However, all sides continued to negotiate. Relations between Irsay and the city of Baltimore deteriorated. Although Irsay assured fans that his ultimate desire was to stay in Baltimore, he nevertheless began discussions with several other cities willing to build new football stadiums, eventually narrowing the list of cities to two: Phoenix and Indianapolis. Under the administration of mayors Richard Lugar and then William Hudnut, Indianapolis had undertaken an ambitious effort to reinvent itself into a 'Great American City'. The Hoosier Dome, which was later renamed the RCA Dome, had been built specifically for, and was ready to host, an NFL expansion team.

Meanwhile, in Baltimore, the situation worsened. The Maryland General Assembly intervened when a bill was introduced to give the city of Baltimore the right to seize ownership of the team by eminent domain. As a result, Irsay began serious negotiations with Indianapolis Mayor William Hudnut in order to move the team before the Maryland legislature could pass the law. Indianapolis offered loans as well as the Hoosier Dome and a training complex. After the deal was reached, moving vans from Indianapolis-based Mayflower Transit were dispatched overnight to the team's Maryland training complex, arriving on the morning of March 29, 1984. Once in Maryland, workers loaded all of the team's belongings, and by midday the trucks departed for Indianapolis, leaving nothing of the Colts organization that could be seized by Baltimore. The Baltimore Colts' Marching Band had to scramble to retrieve their equipment and uniforms before they were shipped to Indianapolis as well.

The move triggered a flurry of legal activity that ended when representatives of the city of Baltimore and the Colts organization reached a settlement in March 1986. Under the agreement, all lawsuits regarding the relocation were dismissed, and the Colts agreed to endorse a new NFL team for Baltimore.
Upon the Colts' arrival in Indianapolis over 143,000 requests for season tickets were received in just two weeks. The move to Indianapolis, however, did not change the recent fortune of the Colts, with the team appearing in the postseason only once in the first 11 seasons in Indianapolis. During the 1984 season, the first in Indianapolis, the team went 4–12 and accounted for the lowest offensive yardage in the league that season. The 1985 and 1986 teams combined for only eight wins, including an 0–13 start in 1986 which prompted the firing of head coach Rod Dowhower, who was replaced by Ron Meyer. The Colts, however, did receive eventual Hall of Fame running back Eric Dickerson as a result of a trade during the 1987 season, and went on to compile a 9–6 record, thereby winning the AFC East and advancing to the postseason for the first time in Indianapolis; they lost that game to the Cleveland Browns.

Following 1987, the Colts did not see any real success for quite some time, with the team missing the postseason for seven consecutive seasons. The struggles came to a climax in 1991 when the team went 1–15 and was just one point away from the first "imperfect" season in the history of a 16-game schedule. The season resulted in the firing of head coach Ron Meyer and the return of former head coach Ted Marchibroda to the organization in 1992; he had coached the team from 1975 to 1979. The team continued to struggle under Marchibroda and Jim Irsay, son of Robert Irsay and general manager at the time. It was in 1994 that Robert Irsay brought in Bill Tobin to become the general manager of the Indianapolis Colts.

Under Tobin, the Colts drafted running back Marshall Faulk with the second overall pick in the 1994 and acquired quarterback Jim Harbaugh as well. These moves along with others saw the Colts begin to turn their fortunes around with playoff appearances in 1995 and 1996. The Colts won their first postseason game as the Indianapolis Colts in 1995 and advanced to the AFC Championship Game against the Pittsburgh Steelers, coming just a Hail Mary pass reception away from a trip to Super Bowl XXX.

Marchibroda retired following the 1995 season and was replaced by Lindy Infante in 1996. After two consecutive playoff appearances, the Colts regressed and went 3–13 during the 1997 season.

Jim Irsay era (1997-present) 
Along with the disappointing season, the principal owner and man who moved the team to Indianapolis, Robert Irsay, died in January 1997 after years of declining health. Jim Irsay, Robert Irsay's son, entered the role of principal owner following his father's death and quickly began to change the organization. Irsay replaced general manager Tobin with Bill Polian in 1997 as the team decided to build through their number one overall pick in the 1998 draft.

Jim Mora years (1998-2001) 

Jim Irsay began to shape the Colts one year after assuming control from his father by firing head coach Lindy Infante and hiring Bill Polian as the general manager of the organization. Polian in turn hired Jim Mora to become the next head coach of the team and drafted Tennessee Volunteer quarterback Peyton Manning, the son of New Orleans Saints legend Archie Manning, with the first overall pick in the 1998 NFL Draft.

The team and Manning struggled during the 1998 season, winning only three games; Manning threw a league high 28 interceptions. However, Manning did pass for 3,739 yards and threw 26 touchdown passes and was  named to the NFL All-Rookie First Team. The Colts began to improve towards the end of the 1998 season and showed continued growth in 1999. Indianapolis drafted Edgerrin James in 1999 and continued to improve their roster heading into the upcoming season. The Colts went 13–3 in 1999 and finished first in the AFC East, their first division title since 1987. Indianapolis lost to the eventual AFC champion Tennessee Titans in the divisional playoffs.

The 2000 and 2001 Colts teams were considerably less successful compared to the 1999 team, and pressure began to mount on team administration and the coaching staff following a 6–10 season in 2001.

Tony Dungy years (2002-2008) 
Head coach Jim Mora was fired at the end of the season and was replaced by former Tampa Bay Buccaneers head coach Tony Dungy. Dungy and the team quickly changed the atmosphere of the organization and returned to the playoffs in 2002 with a 10–6 record. The Colts also returned to the playoffs in 2003 and 2004 with 12–4 records and AFC South championships. The Colts lost to the New England Patriots and Tom Brady in the 2003 AFC Championship Game and in the 2004 divisional playoffs, thereby beginning a rivalry between the two teams, and between Manning and Brady. Following two consecutive playoff losses to the Patriots, the Colts began the 2005 season with a 13–0 record, including a regular season victory over the Patriots, the first in the Manning era. During the season Manning and Marvin Harrison broke the NFL record for touchdowns by a quarterback and receiver tandem. Indianapolis finished the 2005 season with a 14–2 record, the best record in the league that year and the best in a 16 games season for the franchise, but lost to the Pittsburgh Steelers in the divisional round, a disappointing end to the season.

Super Bowl XLI champions (2006) 
Indianapolis entered the 2006 season with a veteran quarterback, receivers, and defenders, and chose running back Joseph Addai in the 2006 draft. As in the previous season, the Colts began the season undefeated and went 9–0 before losing their first game against the Dallas Cowboys. Indianapolis finished the season with a 12–4 record and entered the playoffs for the fifth consecutive year, this time as the number three seed in the AFC. The Colts won their first two playoff games against the Kansas City Chiefs and the Baltimore Ravens to return to the AFC Championship Game for the first time since the 2003 playoffs, where they faced their rivals, the New England Patriots. In a classic game, the Colts overcame a 21–3 first-half deficit to win the game 38–34 and earned a trip to Super Bowl XLI, the franchise's first Super Bowl appearance since 1970 and for the first as Indianapolis. The Colts faced the Chicago Bears in the Super Bowl, winning the game 29–17 and giving Manning, Polian, Irsay, and Dungy, as well as the city of Indianapolis, their first Super Bowl title.

Following their Super Bowl championship, the Colts compiled a 13–3 record during the 2007 season; they lost to the San Diego Chargers in the divisional playoffs, in what was the final game the Colts played at the RCA Dome before moving into Lucas Oil Stadium in 2008. The 2008 season began with Manning being sidelined for most of the pre-season due to surgery. Indianapolis began the season with a 3–4 record, but then won nine consecutive games to end the season at 12–4 and make in into the playoffs as a wild card team, eventually losing to the Chargers in the wild card round. Following the season, Tony Dungy announced his retirement after seven seasons as head coach, having compiled an overall record of 92–33 with the team.

Jim Caldwell years (2009-2011) 
Jim Caldwell was hired as head coach of the team following Dungy, and led the team during the 2009 season. The Colts went 14–0 during the season to finish with an overall record of 14–2 after controversially benching their starters during the last two games. The Colts for the second time in the Manning era entered the playoffs with the best record in the AFC. The Colts managed victories over the Baltimore Ravens and New York Jets to advance to Super Bowl XLIV against the New Orleans Saints, but lost to the Saints 31–17 to end the season in disappointment.

At the completion of the 2009 season, the Colts had finished the first decade of the 2000s (2000–2009) with the most regular-season wins (115) and highest winning percentage (.719) of any team in the NFL during that span.

The 2010 team compiled a 10–6 record, the first time the Colts did not win 12 games since 2002, and lost to the New York Jets in the wild card round of the playoffs. The loss to the Jets was the last game for Peyton Manning as a Colt.

After missing the preseason, Manning was ruled out for the Colts' opening game in Houston and eventually the entire 2011 season. Taking over as starter was veteran quarterback Kerry Collins, who had been signed to the team after dissatisfaction with backup quarterback Curtis Painter and Dan Orlovsky. However, even with a veteran quarterback, the Colts lost their first 13 games and finished the season with a 2–14 record, enough to receive the first overall pick in the 2012 draft. Immediately following the season, team president Bill Polian was fired, ending his 14-year tenure with the team. The change built the anticipation of the organization's decision regarding Manning's future with the team. The Peyton Manning era came to an end on March 8, 2012 when Jim Irsay announced that Manning was being released from the roster after 13 seasons.

Chuck Pagano years (2012-2017) 

During the 2012 off-season owner Jim Irsay hired Ryan Grigson to be the General Manager. Grigson decided to let head coach Jim Caldwell go and Chuck Pagano was hired as the new head coach shortly thereafter. The Colts also began to release some higher paid and oft-injured veteran players, including Joseph Addai, Dallas Clark, and Gary Brackett. The Colts used their number one overall draft pick in 2012 to draft Stanford Cardinal quarterback Andrew Luck and also drafted his teammate Coby Fleener in the second round. The team also switched to a 3–4 defensive scheme.

With productive seasons from both Luck and veteran receiver Reggie Wayne, the Colts rebounded from the 2–14 season of 2011 with a 2012 season record of 11–5. The franchise, team, and fan base rallied behind head coach Chuck Pagano during his fight with leukemia. Clinching an unexpected playoff spot in the 2012–13 NFL playoffs, the 14th playoff berth for the club since 1995. The season ended in a 24–9 playoff loss to the eventual Super Bowl Champion Baltimore Ravens.

Two weeks into the 2013 season, the Colts traded their first-round selection in the 2014 NFL Draft to the Cleveland Browns for running back Trent Richardson. In Week 7, Luck led the Colts to a 39–33 win over his predecessor, Peyton Manning, and the undefeated Broncos. Luck went on to lead the Colts to a 15th division championship later that season.  In the first round of the 2013 NFL playoffs, Andrew Luck led the Colts to a 45–44 victory over Kansas City, outscoring the Chiefs 35–13 in the second half in the 2nd biggest comeback in NFL playoff history.

During the 2014 season, Luck led the Colts to the AFC Championship game for the first time in his career after breaking the Colts' single-season passing yardage record previously held by Manning.

After the Colts finished 8–8 in both the 2015 and 2016 seasons and missed the playoffs in back-to-back seasons for the first time since 1997–98, Grigson was fired as general manager. Just three of his previous 18 draft picks remained on the team at the time of his firing. On January 30, 2017 the team hired Chris Ballard, who served as the Kansas City Chiefs Director of Football Operations, to replace Grigson.

On December 31, 2017, after winning the final game of the season and a final record of 4–12, the Colts parted ways with Pagano. Luck, who had suffered multiple injuries and missed nine games during the 2015 season, sat out the entire 2017 season recovering from shoulder surgery.

In the weeks following the end of the 2017 season, after two interviews, it was widely reported that the Colts would hire Josh McDaniels, offensive coordinator of the New England Patriots, to replace Pagano, after McDaniels fulfilled his obligations to the Patriots in Super Bowl LII. On February 8, 2018, the Colts announced McDaniels as their new head coach. Hours later, however, McDaniels rescinded his decision to be the head coach, and he returned to the Patriots.

Frank Reich years (2018-2022) 
On February 11, 2018, the Colts announced Frank Reich, then offensive coordinator of the Philadelphia Eagles, as their new head coach. In Reich's first season as head coach, Andrew Luck's return to the field got off to a shaky start, as the Colts began the 2018 season 1–5. However, they would surge back to win nine of their last ten games to secure a 10–6 record and a playoff berth. They would win a Wild-Card game against their division rival Houston Texans before falling to the Kansas City Chiefs in the Divisional Round. Luck, benefiting from the Colts' best offensive line of his career, was named the 2018 Comeback Player of the Year.

Colts General Manager Chris Ballard achieved a historic feat in 2018 when two players he had drafted that year, guard Quenton Nelson and linebacker Shaquille Leonard were both named First-Team All-Pro. This was the first time two rookies from the same team received that honor since Hall-of-Famers Dick Butkus and Gale Sayers achieved the feat in 1965.

On August 24, 2019, Luck informed the Colts that he would be retiring from the NFL after not attending training camp. He cited an unfulfilling cycle of injury and rehab as his primary reason for leaving football.

On November 17, 2019, the Colts defeated the Jacksonville Jaguars for the team's 300th win in the Indianapolis era, with a record of 300–267. Despite a promising 5–2 start and strong seasons from Leonard, Nelson, and newly acquired defensive end Justin Houston, the Colts struggled in the second half of the 2019 season with new starting quarterback Jacoby Brissett at the helm and finished the year with a 7–9 record.

On March 17, 2020, the Colts signed longtime Los Angeles Chargers quarterback and eight-time Pro Bowler Philip Rivers to a one-year deal worth $25 million. Rivers led the Colts to an 11–5 record and a playoff berth, where they then lost to the Buffalo Bills in the NFL's first expanded playoffs.

On March 17, 2021, the Colts traded a 2021 third-round pick and a 2022 second-round conditional pick for former Eagles quarterback Carson Wentz. The Colts finished the season 9-8 after an upset loss to the Jacksonville Jaguars that eliminated the Colts from playoff contention. The Colts then traded Wentz and a second round pick to the Washington Commanders in exchange for three draft picks 

On March 21, 2022, the Colts traded a 2022 third-round pick for longtime Atlanta Falcons quarterback Matt Ryan. After playing seven games in which he threw for nine touchdowns and nine interceptions, while also fumbling 11 times, Ryan was benched for the remainder of the season in favor of Sam Ehlinger.

On November 7, 2022, the Colts fired Reich as head coach the day after losing by 23 points to the New England Patriots to continue a disappointing 3-5-1 start. Longtime Colts center Jeff Saturday was subsequently named the interim head coach.

Logos and uniforms

The Colts' helmets in 1953 were white with a blue stripe. In 1954–55 they were blue with a white stripe and a pair of horseshoes at the rear of the helmet. For 1956, the colors were reversed, white helmet, blue stripe and horseshoes at the rear. In 1957 the horseshoes moved to their current location, one on each side of the helmet.

The blue jerseys have white shoulder stripes and the white jerseys have blue stripes. The team also wears white pants with blue stripes down the sides. Both designs originally had sleeve stripes, but by 1957, the uniforms changed to its current form, which evolved as materials changed.

For much of the team's history, the Colts wore blue socks, accenting them with two or three white stripes for much of their history in Baltimore and during the 2004 and 2005 seasons. From 1982 to 1987, the blue socks featured gray stripes. For a period lasting 1955 to 1958 and again from 1988 to 1992, the Colts wore white socks with either two or three blue stripes.

From 1982 through 1986, the Colts wore gray pants with their blue jerseys. The gray pants featured a horseshoe on the top of the sides with the player's number inside the horseshoe. The Colts continued to wear white pants with their white jerseys throughout this period, and in 1987, the gray pants were retired.

The Colts wore blue pants with their white jerseys for the first three games of the 1995 season (pairing them with white socks), but then returned to white pants with both the blue and white jerseys. The team made some minor uniform adjustments before the start of the 2004 season, including reverting from blue to the traditional gray face masks, darkening their blue colors from a royal blue to speed blue, as well as adding two white stripes to the socks. In 2006, the stripes were removed from the socks.

In 2002, the Colts made a minor striping pattern change on their jerseys, having the stripes only on top of the shoulders then stop completely. Previously, the stripes used to go around to underneath the jersey sleeves. This was done because the Colts, like many other football teams, were beginning to manufacture the jerseys to be tighter to reduce holding calls and reduce the size of the sleeves. Although the white jerseys of the Minnesota Vikings at the time also had a similar striping pattern and continued as such (as well as the throwbacks the New England Patriots wore in the Thanksgiving game against the Detroit Lions in 2002, though the Patriots later wore the same throwbacks in 2009 with truncated stripes and in 2010 became their official alternate uniform), the Colts and most college teams with this striping pattern did not make this adjustment.

In 2017, the Colts brought back the blue pants but paired them with the blue jerseys as part of the NFL Color Rush program.

The club officially revealed an updated wordmark logo, as well as updated numeral fonts, on April 13, 2020. While blue and white remained the team's core colors, they added black as a tertiary color, with its usage restricted to the embroidered Nike swoosh on the white uniforms. Despite the wordmark change, the previous wordmarks are still painted on the Lucas Oil Stadium end zones.

Facilities

After 24 years of playing at the RCA Dome, the Colts moved to their new home Lucas Oil Stadium in the fall of 2008. In December 2004, the City of Indianapolis and Jim Irsay agreed to a new stadium deal at an estimated cost of $1 billion (including the Indiana Convention Center upgrades). In a deal estimated at $122 million, Lucas Oil Products won the naming rights to the stadium for 20 years.

Lucas Oil Stadium is a seven-level stadium that seats 63,000 for football. It can be reconfigured to seat 70,000 or more for NCAA basketball and football and concerts. The stadium features a retractable roof allowing the Colts to play home games outdoors for the first time since arriving in Indianapolis. In addition to being larger than the RCA Dome, the new stadium features: 58 permanent concession stands, 90 portable concession stands, 13 escalators, 11 passenger elevators, 800 restrooms, HD video displays from Daktronics and replay monitors and 142 luxury suites. The stadium also features a retractable roof, with electrification technology developed by VAHLE, Inc.  Other than being the home of the Colts, the stadium will host games in both the Men's and Women's NCAA basketball tournaments and will serve as the back up host for all NCAA Final Four Tournaments. The stadium hosted the Super Bowl for the 2011 season (Super Bowl XLVI) and has a potential economic impact estimated at $286 million. Lucas Oil Stadium has also hosted the Drum Corps International World Championships since 2009.

Rivalries

AFC South rivalries

They have dominated the AFC South for much of the division's history, especially during the 2000s and early 2010s, under quarterbacks Peyton Manning and Andrew Luck, but have faced competition for divisional supremacy in recent years from the Texans.

New England Patriots

The rivalry between the Indianapolis Colts and New England Patriots is one of the NFL's newest rivalries. The rivalry is fueled by the quarterback comparison between Peyton Manning and Tom Brady during the 2000s. The Patriots owned the beginning of the series, defeating the Colts in six consecutive contests including the 2003 AFC Championship game and a 2004 AFC Divisional game. The Colts won the next three matches, notching two regular-season victories and a win in the 2006 AFC Championship game on the way to their win in Super Bowl XLI. On November 4, 2007, the Patriots defeated the Colts 24–20; in the next matchup on November 2, 2008, the Colts won 18–15 in a game that was one of the reasons the Patriots failed to make the playoffs; in the 2009 meeting, the Colts staged a spirited comeback to beat the Patriots 35–34; in 2010 the Colts almost staged another comeback, pulling within 31–28 after trailing 31–14 in the fourth quarter, but fell short due to a Patriots interception of a Manning pass late in the game; it turned out to be Manning's final meeting against the Patriots as a member of the Colts.  After a dismal 2011 season that included a 31–24 loss to the Patriots, the Colts drafted Andrew Luck and in November of 2012 the two teams met with identical 6–3 records; the Patriots erased a 14–7 gap to win 59–24. The nature of this rivalry is ironic because the Colts and Patriots were division rivals from 1970 to 2001, but it did not become prominent in league circles until after Indianapolis was relocated to the AFC South. On November 16, 2014, the New England Patriots traveled at 7–2 to play the 6–3 Colts at Lucas Oil Stadium. After a stellar four-touchdown performance by New England running back Jonas Gray, the Patriots defeated the Colts 42–20.  The Patriots followed up with a 45–7 defeat of the Colts in the 2014 AFC Championship Game.

Earliest rivalries
In the years 1953–66, the Colts played in the NFL Western Conference (also known as division), but did not have significant rivalries with other franchises in that alignment, as they were the easternmost team and the rest of the division included the Great Lakes franchises Green Bay, Detroit Lions, Chicago Bears, and after 1961, the Minnesota Vikings, along with the league's two West Coast teams in San Francisco and Los Angeles. The closest team to Baltimore was the Washington Redskins, but they were not in the same division and not very competitive during most years at that time.

New York Giants
In 1958, Baltimore played its first NFL Championship Game against the 10–3 New York Giants. The Giants qualified for the championship after a tie-breaking playoff against the Cleveland Browns. Having already been defeated by the Giants in the regular season, Baltimore was not favored to win, yet proceeded to take the title in sudden death overtime. The Colts then repeated the feat by posting an identical record and routing the Giants in the 1959 final. Up until the Colts' back-to-back titles, the Giants had been the premier club in the NFL, and continued to be post-season stalwarts the next decade, losing three straight finals. The situation was reversed by the end of the decade, with Baltimore winning the 1968 NFL title and New York compiling less impressive results. In recent years, the Colts and Giants featured brothers as their starting quarterbacks (Peyton and Eli Manning respectively), leading to their occasional match-up being referred to as the "Manning Bowl".

New York Jets
Super Bowl III became the most famous upset in professional sports history as the American Football League's New York Jets won 16–7 over the overwhelmingly favored Colts.  With the merger of the AFL and NFL the Colts and Jets were placed in the new AFC East.  The two teams met twice a year (interrupted in 1982 by a player strike) 1970–2001; with the move of the Colts to the AFC South the two teams' rivalry actually escalated, as they met three times in the playoffs in the South's first nine seasons of existence; the Jets crushed the Colts 41–0 in the 2002 Wild Card playoff round; the Colts then defeated the Jets 30–17 in the 2009 AFC Championship Game; but the next year in the Wild Card round the Jets pulled off another playoff upset of the Colts, winning 17–16; it was Peyton Manning's final game with the Colts.  The Jets defeated the Colts 35–9 in 2012 in Andrew Luck's debut season; after two straight losses Luck led a 45–10 rout of the Jets in 2016.

Joe Namath and Johnny Unitas were the focal point of the rivalry at its beginning, but they did not meet for a full game until September 24, 1972.  Namath erupted with six touchdowns and 496 passing yards despite only 28 throws and 15 completions.  Unitas threw for 376 yards and two scores but was sacked six times as the Jets won 44–34; the game was considered one of the top ten passing duels in NFL history.

Miami Dolphins

Baltimore's post NFL-AFL merger passage to the AFC saw them thrust into a new environment with little in common with its fellow divisional teams: the Jets, Miami Dolphins, Buffalo Bills, and Boston Patriots. One angle where Baltimore and Miami did have something in common, however, came in new Miami coach Don Shula. Shula had coached the Colts the previous seven pre-merger seasons (1963–69) and was signed by Joe Robbie after the merger was consummated; because the signing came after the merger the NFL's rules on tampering came into play, and the Dolphins had to give up their first-round pick to the Colts.

Powered by QB Earl Morrall Baltimore was the first non-AFL franchise to win a division title in the conference, outlasting the Miami Dolphins by one game, and leading the division since Week 3 of 1970. The two franchises were denied a playoff confrontation by Miami's first-round defeat to the Oakland Raiders, whereas Baltimore won its first Super Bowl title that year.

Yet in 1971, the teams were engaged in a heated race that went down to the final week of the season, where Miami won its first division title with a 10–3–1 title compared to the 10–4 Baltimore record after the Colts won the Week 13 matchup between them at home, but proceeded to lose the last game of the season to Boston. In the playoffs, Baltimore advanced to the AFC title game after a 20–3 victory over the Cleveland Browns, while Miami won in double overtime against the Kansas City Chiefs. This set up a title game that was favored for the defending league champion Colts. Yet Miami won the AFC championship with a 21–0 shutout and advanced to lose Super Bowl VI to Dallas. In 1975 Baltimore and Miami tied with 10–4 records, yet the Colts advanced to the playoffs based on a head-to-head sweep of their series. In 1977 Baltimore tied for first for the third straight year (in 1976 they tied with the now-New England Patriots) with Miami, and this time advanced to the playoffs on even slimmer pretenses, with a conference record of 9–3 compared to Miami's 8–4, as they had split the season series. The rivalry in the following years was virtually negated by very poor play of the Colts; the Colts won just 117 games in the twenty-one seasons (1978–98) that bracketed their 1977 playoff loss to the Oakland Raiders and the 1999 trade of star running back Marshall Faulk; this included a 0–8–1 record during the NFL's strike-shortened 1982 season.

In 1995, now as Indianapolis, the two both posted borderline 9–7 records to tie for second against Buffalo, yet the Colts once again reached the post-season having swept the season series. The following season they edged out Miami by posting a 9–7 record and winning the ordinarily meaningless 3rd-place position, but qualifying for the wild card.  The two clubs' 1999 meetings were dramatic affairs between Hall Of Fame-bound Dan Marino and up-and-coming star Peyton Manning.  Marino led a 25-point fourth-quarter comeback for a 34–31 Dolphins win at the RCA Dome, and then in Miami Marino led another comeback to tie the game 34–34 with 36 seconds remaining; Manning, however, drove the Colts in range for a 53-yard field goal as time expired (37–34 Colts win).

The last truly meaningful matchup between the two franchises was in the 2000 season, when Miami edged out Indianapolis with an 11–5 record for the division championship. The two then met in the wild-card round where the Dolphins won 23–17 before being blown out by Oakland 27–0 (the Colts themselves had suffered a bitter loss to the Raiders in Week 2 of the season when the Raiders erased a 24–7 gap to win 38–31). In 2002 the Colts moved to the newly created AFC South division; the two clubs met at the RCA Dome on September 15 where the Dolphins edged the Colts 21–13 after stopping a late Colts drive. The rivalry was effectively retired after this; the two clubs did meet in a memorable Monday Night Football matchup in 2009 where the Colts, despite having the ball for only 15 minutes, defeated the Dolphins 27–23.

The rivalry saw a rekindling after the 2012 NFL Draft brought new quarterbacks to both teams in Ryan Tannehill and Luck. The two met during the 2012 season with Luck breaking the rookie record for passing yards in a game in a 23–20 win over the Dolphins, but Tannehill and the Dolphins beat the Colts 24–20 the next season.  The Dolphins win began a slump for Luck and the Colts against AFC East teams (eight straight losses by the Colts) that ended in December 2016 against the Jets, when they defeated them by a score of 41–10.

Players of note

Current roster

Retired numbers

Pro Football Hall of Famers

Ring of Honor

The Ring of Honor was established on September 23, 1996. There have been 15 inductees.

First-round draft picks

Staff and head coaches

Head coaches

Current staff

Statistics and records

Season-by-season record
This is a partial list of the Colts' last five completed seasons. For the full season-by-season franchise results, see List of Indianapolis Colts seasons.

Note: The Finish, Wins, Losses, and Ties columns list regular season results and exclude any postseason play.

Records

Radio and television coverage

The Colts' flagship radio stations since 2007 are WFNI (1070 AM, currently silent but with its repeater signals at 93.5 FM and 107.5 FM continuing to function as "93.5/107.5 The Fan" using WIBC-HD2 as a signal source) and WLHK 97.1 FM. The 1070 AM frequency, then known as WIBC, had also been the flagship from 1984 to 1992 and from 1995 to 1997.

Matt Taylor is the team's play-by-play announcer, succeeding Bob Lamey in 2018. Lamey held the job from 1984 to 1991 and again from 1995 to 2018. Former Colts backup quarterback Jim Sorgi serves as the "color commentator". Mike Jansen serves as the public address announcer at all Colts home games. Jansen has been the public address announcer since the 1998 season.

The team's local TV carriage rights were shaken up in mid-2014 when WTTV's owner Tribune Media came to terms with CBS to become the network's Indianapolis affiliate as of January 1, 2015, replacing WISH-TV. With the deal, both Tribune Media stations, including WXIN (channel 59) carry the bulk of the team's regular-season games starting with the 2015 NFL season. Also as of the 2015 season, WTTV and WXIN became the official Colts stations and air the team's preseason games, along with official team programming and coach's shows, and have a signage presence along the fascia of Lucas Oil Stadium.

WISH's sister station WNDY-TV aired preseason games from 2011 to 2014, having replaced WTTV at that time.

Radio station affiliates

Indiana

Illinois

Kentucky

Indianapolis Colts Radio Affiliates

References

External links
 
 Indianapolis Colts at the National Football League official website

 
National Football League teams
Sports clubs established in 1953
1953 establishments in Maryland